Stan Anderson (22 June 1939 – 3 December 1997) was a Scottish football player and manager.

Anderson was born in Craigneuk, Scotland. He started his career in 1957 at Hamilton Academical. He moved to Rangers two years later but was unable to break into the senior team, making only one appearance for the club during a 4–1 win over Clyde on 27 April 1960. A return to Accies followed in 1961 then a season with Queen of the South before a final spell with Hamilton. In 1966 Anderson moved to Clyde and went on to make over one hundred appearances for the team.

After retiring in 1970, Anderson joined the Dumbarton coaching staff. He returned to Rangers as reserve-team coach under William Waddell and later Jock Wallace. In 1973, he was appointed manager of Clyde,  spending three seasons in charge.

References

Scottish footballers
Hamilton Academical F.C. players
Rangers F.C. players
Queen of the South F.C. players
Clyde F.C. players
Scottish football managers
Clyde F.C. managers
Rangers F.C. non-playing staff
Scottish Football League players
1939 births
1997 deaths
Scottish Football League managers
Association football wing halves
Sportspeople from Wishaw
Footballers from North Lanarkshire